Hidden Valley Ski Area is a ski resort in the St. Louis, Missouri suburb of Wildwood, Missouri.

About 
All of these trails feature Snowmaking, with a capacity of 6600 gallons of water per minute. The trails are served by 9 lifts, 5 of which are chairlifts, the remaining 4 being surface lifts.

History 
Tim Boyd bought the Wildwood Golf Course for $250,000 in 1977. In 1982 he converted the hills to a ski resort while maintaining the golf course.  The resort would be the first of several resorts throughout the Midwest and Northeast United States he developed or acquired through his company Peak Resorts.

Boyd ultimately entered an agreement to place the ski resort in a conservation easement in exchange for permission to build 80 homes on the golf property (which has since been closed).

At the beginning of the 2012-2013 season, Hidden Valley opened two additional runs on an adjacent hill. They dubbed this new area "West Mountain". With this expansion, one additional chair lift was added to allow access to these runs.

In January 2018, the City of Wildwood passed a vote to allow Hidden Valley to build a zip line tour which enabled the property to open year round. The ZipTour opened in June 2019.

In 2019, Vail Resorts acquired previous owner Peak Resorts, putting the ski area under it's ownership.

See also
List of ski areas and resorts in the United States

References

External links
 Official website

Ski areas and resorts in Missouri
Peak Resorts
Golf clubs and courses in Missouri
Buildings and structures in St. Louis County, Missouri
Tourist attractions in St. Louis County, Missouri
1982 establishments in Missouri